The American University of Barbados School of Medicine (AUB), founded in 2011, is a private medical school with its main campus in Wildey, Barbados. When it opened in January 2012, it was the first offshore private medical school in Barbados, started as a branch of Era's Lucknow Medical College and Hospital, based in Lucknow, India.

History 
The medical school was founded in 2011 and started operations at Silver Sands. As of November 2015, the school had 135 students, with two Barbadians for every five foreign students.

In 2016, the AUB acquired the former BET building, and moved its operations there. In February 2020, American University of Barbados awarded medical degrees to 67 graduates at its inaugural graduation ceremony. As of 2020, students were enrolled from 24 countries.

Recognition and accreditation 

 American University of Barbados (AUB) received an initial provisional accreditation for 2018–2020 from the Caribbean Accreditation Authority for Education in Medicine and other Health Professions, a registered body that accredits Caribbean medical schools.
 American University of Barbados (AUB) is registered as a tertiary provider of education by the Barbados Accreditation Council.
 AUB is recognized by the Educational Commission for Foreign Medical Graduatesand this grants students the right to take the licentiate exam, United States Medical Licensing Examination to become a practicing physician in the United States.
 In 2017, the Medical Council of India included the American University of Barbados in its list of foreign universities / institutions that have been approved by authorities in their respective nations.
 American University of Barbados (AUB) is listed in World Directory of Medical School

See also 
 List of medical schools in the Caribbean
 Ross University School of Medicine

References

External links 
Study Medicine | Best Caribbean Medical Schools | Study MBBS

Medical schools in Barbados